"Someone" is a song by American R&B group SWV, released as the second single from their third studio album Release Some Tension on June 24, 1997. It features a guest appearance from American rapper and producer Sean Combs. The song samples "Ten Crack Commandments" and "The World is Filled..." both by The Notorious B.I.G., from his album Life After Death, which had been released five months earlier. "Someone" peaked at number five on the US Billboard Hot R&B Singles chart and number 19 on the Billboard Hot 100, receiving a Gold certification from the Recording Industry Association of America. In Canada and New Zealand, the single reached number 28, and in the United Kingdom, it debuted at number 34; it is to date SWV's last charting single in all three countries.

Music video
A music video was released for the single, shot in New York City and directed by Joseph Kahn.

Track listing
US Promo
 Someone (Radio Edit) – 3:49
 Someone (LP Version) – 4:05
 Someone (Instrumental) – 4:55
 Someone (A Cappella) – 4:52

US CD
 Someone (LP Version) – 4:05
 Love Like This (LP Version) – 3:46

UK CD
 Someone (LP Version) – 4:05
 Someone (Instrumental) – 4:55
 Someone (A Cappella) – 4:52
 Right Here (Demolition Mix) – 4:58

Charts and certifications

Weekly charts

Year-end charts

Certifications

Release history

References 

1997 singles
SWV songs
1997 songs
RCA Records singles
Contemporary R&B ballads
Soul ballads
1990s ballads